Enteromius chicapaensis is a species of ray-finned fish in the genus Enteromius which is found in the central Congo Basin of Angola.

References

 

Endemic fauna of Angola
Enteromius
Taxa named by Max Poll
Fish described in 1967